Temesa is a genus of medium-sized air-breathing land snails, terrestrial pulmonate gastropods in the family Clausiliidae, the door snails. The fossil record of this genus ranges tentatively from the Brazilian Paleocene of the Itaboraí Basin, in Rio de Janeiro State, where the species T. magalhaesi is found.

Species 
The genus includes the following species:

 T. magalhaesi (Trindade, 1953) - fossil from Brazil

References 

Clausiliidae
Paleocene gastropods